The 2013–14 Dallas Stars season was the 47th season for the National Hockey League franchise that was established on June 5, 1967, and 21st season since the franchise relocated to Dallas to start the 1993–94 NHL season. On April 11, 2014, the Stars beat the St. Louis Blues 3–0 to clinch a playoff spot for the first time since the 2007–08 season.

Off-season
The Stars unveiled a new logo and jersey at an event on June 4, 2013. They also announced that the organization will retire Mike Modano's # 9 jersey on March 8, 2014 before their game versus the Minnesota Wild.

The Stars hired Lindy Ruff as their new head coach on June 21, 2013.

The Stars promoted Jamie Benn to Captain on September 19, 2013, filling the vacancy created when Brenden Morrow was traded to the Pittsburgh Penguins during the prior season.

Standings

Schedule and results

Pre-season

Regular season

Playoffs

The Dallas Stars entered the playoffs as the Western Conference's second wild card. They were defeated by the Anaheim Ducks in the first round in six games.

Player statistics
Final Stats 
Skaters

Goaltenders

†Denotes player spent time with another team before joining the Stars.  Stats reflect time with the Stars only.
‡Traded mid-season
Bold/italics denotes franchise record

Milestones

Transactions 
The Stars have been involved in the following transactions during the 2013–14 season:

Trades

Free agents signed

Free agents lost

Claimed via Waivers

Lost via Waivers

Player signings

Draft picks

Dallas Stars' picks at the 2013 NHL Entry Draft, to be held in Newark, New Jersey on June 30, 2013.

 
Draft notes

 The Boston Bruins' first-round pick went to the Dallas Stars as a result of an April 2, 2013 trade that sent Jaromir Jagr to the Bruins in exchange for Lane MacDermid, Cody Payne and this pick.
 The Vancouver Canucks' second-round pick went to the Dallas Stars as a result of an April 2, 2013 trade that sent Derek Roy to the Canucks in exchange for Kevin Connauton and this pick.
 The Edmonton Oilers' third-round pick went to the Dallas Stars as a result of a January 14, 2013 trade that sent Mark Fistric to the Oilers in exchange for this pick.
 The Dallas Stars' third-round pick went to the Montreal Canadiens as the result of a February 26, 2013 trade that sent Erik Cole to the Stars in exchange for a Michael Ryder and this pick.
 The Pittsburgh Penguins' fifth-round pick went to the Dallas Stars as a result of a March 24, 2013 trade that sent Brenden Morrow and a 2013 third-round pick to the Penguins in exchange for Joe Morrow and this pick.
 The Dallas Stars' sixth-round pick went to the Ottawa Senators as the result of a June 7, 2013 trade that sent the rights to Sergei Gonchar to the Stars in exchange for this pick.
 The Florida Panthers' seventh-round pick went to the Dallas Stars as a result of a June 23, 2012 trade that sent a 2012 seventh-round pick to the Panthers in exchange for this pick.
 The Dallas Stars' seventh-round pick went to the Los Angeles Kings as the result of a June 23, 2012 trade that sent a 2012 seventh-round pick to the Stars in exchange for this pick.

Notes

References

Dallas Stars seasons
Dallas Stars season, 2013-14
Dal
Dallas Stars
Dallas Stars
2010s in Dallas
2013 in Texas
2014 in Texas